Phillip Atiba Goff is an American psychologist known for researching the relationship between race and policing in the United States. He was appointed the inaugural Franklin A. Thomas Professor in Policing Equity at the John Jay College of Criminal Justice in 2016, the college's first endowed professorship. In 2020, he became a Professor of African-American Studies and Psychology at Yale University.

Early life 

Goff grew up in Philadelphia. He earned an AB from Harvard University in 1999 in Afro-American studies. He received an MA in 2001 in Social Psychology and a Ph.D. in Social Psychology from Stanford University in 2005.

Career 
Goff has been a visiting scholar at the Harvard University Kennedy School of Government and an associate professor of social psychology  at the University of California, Los Angeles. He taught at Pennsylvania State University between 2004-2005.

Goff is the Co-founder and CEO of the research center/action organization Center for Policing Equity, which conducts research with the aim of ensuring accountable and racially unbiased policing in the United States. CPE is the host of a National Science Foundation-funded effort to collect national data on police behavior, specifically stops and use of force, called the National Justice Database. The analytic framework Goff developed as part of the NJD has been called a potential model for police data accountability nationally. In 2016, a decade after its founding, the Center relocated from UCLA to John Jay. In 2020, the Center relocated from John Jay to Yale.

Goff was also a key figure in the founding of the National Initiative for Building Community Trust and Justice in 2014  and gave testimony before the President's Task Force on 21st Century Policing.

Research
In 2008, Goff, Margaret Thomas, and Matthew Christian Jackson published findings that white undergraduates incorrectly identified black women by sex more than any other race or gender.

He has published extensively in journals.

Personal life

In 1999, Goff co-founded the Oakland, California-based queer hip hop group Deep Dickollective. During his time as a musician in this group, he was known as "Lightskindid Philosopher" or LSP.

References

External links
Biography at Center for Policing Equity
Goff's page on Social Psychology Network
 TED talk in 2019

American social psychologists
African-American psychologists
Living people
Stanford University alumni
John Jay College of Criminal Justice faculty
University of California, Los Angeles faculty
Rappers from California
Harvard College alumni
21st-century American rappers
1977 births
21st-century African-American musicians
20th-century African-American people